Narayanapura is a small village in Mandya district of Karnataka state, India.

Location

Tourist attractions
Narayanapura is known for its temples and natural scenery.  Kere Thonnooru and Shingapooru are two villages of scenic beauty where many Kannada films were shot.

See also
 Kere Thonnuru
 Shingapoore
 Pandavapura

Image gallery

References

Villages in Mandya district